The 1939 Norwegian Football Cup was the 38th season of the Norwegian annual knockout football tournament. The tournament was open for all members of NFF, except those from Northern Norway. This final is the only final held in Tønsberg and was played at Tønsberg Gressbane on 15 October 1939. In the final, two-time former winners Sarpsborg won 2–1 against Skeid, who played their first final, and secured their third title. Fredrikstad were the defending champions, but were eliminated by Sarpsborg in the semifinal.

First round

 

|-
|colspan="3" style="background-color:#97DEFF"|Replay

|}

Fredrikstad, Skeid, Hamar, Ørn, Stavanger, Hardy, Kristiansund and Rosenborg had a walkover.

Second round

|-
|colspan="3" style="background-color:#97DEFF"|Replay

|}

Fredrikstad, Skeid, Hardy and Rosenborg had a walkover.

Third round

|}

Fredrikstad and Skeid had a walkover.

Fourth round

|}

Quarter-finals

|}

Semi-finals

|}

Final

See also
1938–39 League of Norway
1939 in Norwegian football

References

Norwegian Football Cup seasons
Norway
Cup